Richard Rocky Joojo Obeng (born 1981) is a Ghanaian politician, financial analyst and the regional minister for Western North. He is from Enchi.

Education 
He attended University of Ghana, where he studied Economics and Statistics for three years of which he later had a transfer to the University of Witwatersrand. In Witwatersrand, he graduated with a first class honours in Finance. Hon. Obeng attended St. Johns Senior Secondary School, Sekondi. and had his basic education at Commey Memorial School, Enchi.

Career 
He is a financial analyst, civil society activist, entrepreneur and politician. He has over ten years of experience as a derivative specialist and a capital market analyst from both Johannesburg Stock Exchange and New York Stock Exchange. He was a deputy C.E.O for National Youth Authority,  he founded the Centre for National Affairs and engages in social activities where he supports Ghanaian youth.

Politics 
He is the regional minister for western north region.

References 

1981 births
Living people
New Patriotic Party politicians
Financial analysts
University of the Witwatersrand alumni